The Warruŋu, also known as the Warungu/Warrongo, were an Indigenous Australian people of the northern Queensland rainforest areas south of Cairns.

Language
The Warrongo language, extinct since the death of the last speaker Alf Palmer in 1981, is classified as a member of the Maric branch of the Pama–Nyungan languages. Tsunoda Tasaku made a claim for Warungu having 'the strongest syntactic ergativity' of all the world's languages. The claim has been challenged by Robert M. W. Dixon who believes that the conversational material on which it is based is vitiated by confusions in the informant.

Country
Mount Garnet marks their northern border. From there their territory extended southeast along the Herbert River.

Society
The Warrongo bore close linguistic and cultural affinities with the Gudjal and Gugu Badhun peoples, all three occupying the Herbert and Upper Burdekin rivers.
Like other contiguous groups of this area, the Warrango divided their members into 4 'skin' sections.
 gorgorro (polite form:goynba). Totem =carpet snake(gabol)/sparrowhawk (garrgay)
 gorgilla (polite form:woragaja) Totem=crow (wajagan)/eaglehawk (gorrijala)
 won.go   (polite form:wolmirri) Totem=echnidna (barrbira)/dove (?gorraga)
 wojorro  (polite formn:yawonya) Totem=eagelhawk/Carpet snake/emu (gondolo)

History of contact
Tin was discovered in the vicinity of Warrongo territory, in the Wild river area in 1880. John Atherton's Cashmere station, and the Gunnawarra station, were established on their territory in the mid 1870s. The surging influx of miners led to many clashes and massacres. At Blencoe Falls, a group of Warrongo were driven off the cliffs to plunge into the gorge. Very little knowledge survived of these people.

Last speakers
 Alf Palmer, boat-builder, who also knew Jirrbal, Girramay, and Warrgamay. His mother Lucy was one of the people pushed into the gorge to drown at Blencoe Falls.

Some words
 warrngu (woman).

Notes

Citations

Sources

Aboriginal peoples of Queensland
Far North Queensland